The 1854–55 United States House of Representatives elections were held on various dates in various states between August 4, 1854 and November 6, 1855. Each state set its own date for its elections to the House of Representatives before the first session of the 34th United States Congress convened on December 3, 1855. They were held during President Franklin Pierce's term. Elections were held for all 334 seats, representing 31 states.

This midterm election was among the most disruptive in American history, auguring the collapse of the Second Party System. Both major parties, the Democratic Party and the Whig Party, organized as rivals for roughly 20 years, lost critical voter support.  Northern voters strongly opposed to the Kansas–Nebraska Act shifted sharply against Democrats, who lost 69 seats, nearly half their House delegation.  Whigs also lost seats as the party disintegrated over slavery.

The elected majority temporarily coalesced as the Opposition Party.  This transitional party included Whigs, Free Soil members, American Party members (or Know Nothings), the People's Party of Indiana, Anti-Nebraska candidates, disaffected Northern Democrats, and members of the nascent Republican Party, which would soon absorb most of these factions and replace the Whigs as rival to the Democrats.

Candidates opposed to the Democratic Party won widely in the North through November 1854. The American Party, ignoring slavery and opposing immigration (particularly by Catholics from Ireland and Germany) won seats from both major parties, but to the net loss of Democrats, in New England and the South from November 1854 into 1855.

Congress had passed the Kansas–Nebraska Act in May 1854 after aggressive sponsorship by the Pierce Administration and Democrats led by Illinois Senator Stephen Douglas, including radical pro-slavery legislators. The Act repealed the 1820 Missouri Compromise and triggered the Bleeding Kansas conflict. With widely foreseen risks and immediately negative results, the Act publicly discredited the Democratic Party, fueling new partisan and sectional rancor. It created violent uncertainty on the frontier by abruptly making slavery potentially legal in territories originally comprising the northern portion of the Louisiana Purchase and attractive to contemporary settlers. Settlers were expected to determine the status of slavery locally. This idea appealed to Democratic politicians and to some voters in its shape and intent, but proved unworkable in Kansas where the status of slavery would be violently disputed between more numerous Northern settlers and geographically closer Southern settlers. Even some pro-slavery legislators and voters, particularly Southern Whigs, felt repealing the Missouri Compromise was politically reckless and attempting to push slavery by law and force into territories where most settlers predictably were unlikely to want it endangered its continued legal protection anywhere, even in the South. These fears proved prescient.

More than 21 Representatives vied for the post of Speaker. After two months and 133 ballots, American Party Representative Nathaniel Banks of Massachusetts, also a Free Soiler, defeated Democrat William Aiken of South Carolina by plurality, 103–100. Banks is also the only Speaker from a third party to date.

Election summaries

Special elections 

There were four special elections to the 33rd United States Congress, listed here by date and district.

|-
! 
| Henry A. Muhlenberg
|  | Democratic
| 1852
|  | Incumbent died January 9, 1854.New member elected February 4, 1854.Democratic hold.
| nowrap | 

|-
! 
| Zeno Scudder
|  | Whig
| 1850
|  | Incumbent resigned March 4, 1854.New member elected April 17, 1854.Whig hold.
| nowrap | 

|-
! 
| Gilbert Dean
|  | Democratic
| 1850
|  | Incumbent resigned July 3, 1854.New member elected November 7, 1854.Whig gain.
| nowrap | 

|-
! 
| Presley Ewing
|  | Whig
| 1851
|  | Incumbent died September 27, 1854.New member elected November 13, 1854.Whig hold.
| nowrap | 

|}

Alabama 

|-
! 
| Philip Phillips
|  | Democratic
| 1853
|  | Incumbent retired.New member elected.Know Nothing gain.
| nowrap | 

|-
! 
| James Abercrombie
|  | Whig
| 1851
|  | Incumbent retired.New member elected.Democratic gain.
| nowrap | 

|-
! 
| James Ferguson Dowdell
|  | Democratic
| 1853
| Incumbent re-elected.
| nowrap | 

|-
! 
| William Russell Smith
|  | Democratic
| 1851
|  | Incumbent re-elected to a new party.Know Nothing gain.
| nowrap | 

|-
! 
| George S. Houston
|  | Democratic
| 1843
| Incumbent re-elected.
| nowrap | 

|-
! 
| Williamson Robert Winfield Cobb
|  | Democratic
| 1847
| Incumbent re-elected.
| nowrap | 

|-
! 
| Sampson Willis Harris
|  | Democratic
| 1847
| Incumbent re-elected.
| nowrap | 

|}

Arkansas 

|-
! 
| Alfred B. Greenwood
|  | Democratic
| 1852
| Incumbent re-elected.
| nowrap | 

|-
! 
| Edward A. Warren
|  | Democratic
| 1852
|  | Incumbent retired.New member elected.Democratic hold.
| nowrap | 

|}

California 

Note: From statehood to 1864, California's representatives were elected at-large, with the top two vote-getters winning election from 1849 to 1858.

|-
! rowspan=2 | 
| Milton S. Latham
|  | Democratic
| 1852
|  | Incumbent withdrew.New member elected.Democratic hold.
| rowspan=2 nowrap | 

|-
| James A. McDougall
|  | Democratic
| 1852
|  | Incumbent lost re-election.New member elected.Democratic hold.

|}

Connecticut 

|-
! 
| James T. Pratt
|  | Democratic
| 1853
|  | Incumbent lost re-election.New member elected.Know Nothing gain.
| nowrap | 

|-
! 
| Colin M. Ingersoll
|  | Democratic
| 1851
|  | Incumbent retired.New member elected.Know Nothing gain.
| nowrap | 

|-
! 
| Nathan Belcher
|  | Democratic
| 1853
|  | Incumbent lost re-election.New member elected.Know Nothing gain.
| nowrap | 

|-
! 
| Origen S. Seymour
|  | Democratic
| 1851
|  | Incumbent retired.New member elected.Know Nothing gain.
| nowrap | 

|}

Delaware 

|-
! 
| George R. Riddle
|  | Democratic
| 1850
|  | Incumbent lost re-election.New member elected.Know Nothing gain.
| nowrap | 

|}

Florida 

|-
! 
| Augustus Maxwell
|  | Democratic
| 1852
| Incumbent re-elected.
| nowrap | 

|}

Georgia 

|-
! 
| James Lindsay Seward
|  | Democratic
| 1853
| Incumbent re-elected.
| nowrap | 

|-
! 
| Alfred H. Colquitt
|  | Democratic
| 1853
|  | Incumbent retired.New member elected.Democratic hold.
| nowrap | 

|-
! 
| David Jackson Bailey
|  | Democratic
| 1851
|  | Incumbent retired.New member elected.Know Nothing gain.
| nowrap | 

|-
! 
| William Barton Wade Dent
|  | Democratic
| 1853
|  | Incumbent retired.New member elected.Democratic hold.
| nowrap | 

|-
! 
| Elijah Webb Chastain
|  | Democratic
| 1851
|  | Incumbent retired.New member elected.Democratic hold.
| nowrap | 

|-
! 
| Junius Hillyer
|  | Democratic
| 1851
|  | Incumbent retired.New member elected.Democratic hold.
| nowrap | 

|-
! 
| David Addison Reese
|  | Whig
| 1853
|  | Incumbent retired.New member elected.Know Nothing gain.
| nowrap | 

|-
! 
| Alexander Stephens
|  | Whig
| 1853
|  | Incumbent re-elected to a new party.Democratic gain.
| nowrap | 

|}

Illinois 

|-
! 
| Elihu B. Washburne
|  | Whig
| 1852
|  | Incumbent re-elected to a new party.Republican gain.
| nowrap | 

|-
! 
| John Wentworth
|  | Democratic
| 1852
|  | Incumbent retired.New member elected.Republican gain.
| nowrap | 

|-
! 
| Jesse O. Norton
|  | Whig
| 1852
|  | Incumbent re-elected to a new party.Republican gain.
| nowrap | 

|-
! 
| James Knox
|  | Whig
| 1852
|  | Incumbent re-elected to a new party.Republican gain.
| nowrap | 

|-
! 
| William A. Richardson
|  | Democratic
| 1847 
| Incumbent re-elected.
| nowrap | 

|-
! 
| Richard Yates
|  | Whig
| 1852
|  | Incumbent lost re-election.New member elected.Democratic gain.
| nowrap | 

|-
! 
| James C. Allen
|  | Democratic
| 1852
|  | Incumbent re-elected.Election disqualified.Democratic loss.
| nowrap | 

|-
! 
| William Henry Bissell
|  | IndependentDemocratic
| 1848
|  | Incumbent retired.New member elected.Democratic gain.
| nowrap | 

|-
! 
| Willis Allen
|  | Democratic
| 1850
|  | Incumbent retired.New member elected.Democratic hold.
| nowrap | 

|}

Indiana 

|-
! 
| Smith Miller
|  | Democratic
| 1852
| Incumbent re-elected.
| nowrap | 

|-
! 
| William Hayden English
|  | Democratic
| 1852
| Incumbent re-elected.
| nowrap | 

|-
! 
| Cyrus L. Dunham
|  | Democratic
| 1849
|  | Incumbent lost re-election.New member elected.People's gain.
| nowrap | 

|-
! 
| James H. Lane
|  | Democratic
| 1852
|  | Incumbent retired.New member elected.People's gain.
| nowrap | 

|-
! 
| Samuel W. Parker
|  | Whig
| 1851
|  | Incumbent retired.New member elected.People's gain.
| nowrap | 

|-
! 
| Thomas A. Hendricks
|  | Democratic
| 1851
|  | Incumbent lost re-election.New member elected.People's gain.
| nowrap | 

|-
! 
| John G. Davis
|  | Democratic
| 1851
|  | Incumbent lost re-election.New member elected.People's gain.
| nowrap | 

|-
! 
| Daniel Mace
|  | Democratic
| 1851
|  | Incumbent re-elected to a new party.People's gain.
| nowrap | 

|-
! 
| Norman Eddy
|  | Democratic
| 1852
|  | Incumbent lost re-election.New member elected.People's gain.
| nowrap | 

|-
! 
| Ebenezer M. Chamberlain
|  | Democratic
| 1852
|  | Incumbent lost re-election.New member elected.People's gain.
| nowrap | 

|-
! 
| Andrew J. Harlan
|  | Democratic
| 1852
|  | Incumbent lost re-election.New member elected.People's gain.
| nowrap | 

|}

Iowa 

|-
! 
| Bernhart Henn
|  | Democratic
| 1850
|  | Incumbent retired.New member elected.Democratic hold.
| nowrap | 

|-
! 
| William Vandever
|  | Whig
| 1852
|  | Incumbent retired.New member elected.Whig hold.
| nowrap | 

|}

Kentucky 

Source: Tribune Almanac

|-
! 
| Linn Boyd
|  | Democratic
| 1839
|  | Incumbent retired.New member elected.Democratic hold.
| nowrap | 

|-
! 
| Benjamin E. Grey
|  | Whig
| 1851
|  | Incumbent lost re-election.New member elected.Know Nothing gain.
| nowrap | 

|-
! 
| Francis Bristow
|  | Whig
| 1854 
|  | Incumbent retired.New member elected.Know Nothing gain.
| nowrap | 

|-
! 
| James Chrisman
|  | Democratic
| 1853
|  | Incumbent retired.New member elected.Democratic hold.
| nowrap | 

|-
! 
| Clement S. Hill
|  | Whig
| 1853
|  | Incumbent retired.New member elected.Democratic gain.
| nowrap | 

|-
! 
| John Milton Elliott
|  | Democratic
| 1853
| Incumbent re-elected.
| nowrap | 

|-
! 
| William Preston
|  | Whig
| 1852 
|  | Incumbent lost re-election.New member elected.Know Nothing gain.
| nowrap | 

|-
! 
| John C. Breckinridge
|  | Democratic
| 1851
|  | Incumbent retired.New member elected.Know Nothing gain.
| nowrap | 

|-
! rowspan=2 | 
| Leander Cox
|  | Whig
| 1853
|  | Incumbent re-elected to a new party.Know Nothing gain.
| rowspan=2 nowrap | 
|-
| Richard H. Stanton
|  | Democratic
| 1849
|  | Incumbent lost re-election.Democratic loss.

|-
! 
| colspan=3 | None 
|  | New seat.New member elected.Know Nothing gain.
| nowrap | 

|}

Louisiana 

|-
! 
| William Dunbar
|  | Democratic
| 1852
|  | Incumbent retired.New member elected.Know Nothing gain.
| nowrap | 

|-
! 
| Theodore Gaillard Hunt
|  | Whig
| 1852
|  | Incumbent lost re-election.New member elected.Democratic gain.
| nowrap | 

|-
! 
| John Perkins Jr.
|  | Democratic
| 1852
|  | Incumbent retired.New member elected.Democratic hold.
| nowrap | 

|-
! 
| Roland Jones
|  | Democratic
| 1852
|  | Incumbent retired.New member elected.Democratic hold.
| nowrap | 

|}

Maine 

|-
! 
| Moses Macdonald
|  | Democratic
| 1850
|  | Incumbent retired.New member elected.Republican gain.
| nowrap | 

|-
! 
| Samuel Mayall
|  | Democratic
| 1852
|  | Incumbent retired.New member elected.Republican gain.
| nowrap | 

|-
! 
| E. Wilder Farley
|  | Whig
| 1852
|  | Incumbent lost re-election.New member elected.Republican gain.
| nowrap | 

|-
! 
| Samuel P. Benson
|  | Whig
| 1852
|  | Incumbent re-elected to a new party.Republican gain.
| nowrap | 

|-
! 
| Israel Washburn Jr.
|  | Whig
| 1850
|  | Incumbent re-elected to a new party.Republican gain.
| nowrap | 

|-
! 
| Thomas J. D. Fuller
|  | Democratic
| 1848
| Incumbent re-elected.
| nowrap | 

|}

Maryland 

|-
! 
| John Rankin Franklin
|  | Whig
| 1853
|  | Incumbent retired.New member elected.Democratic gain.
| nowrap | 

|-
! 
| Jacob Shower
|  | Democratic
| 1853
|  | Incumbent lost re-election.New member elected.Know Nothing gain.
| nowrap | 

|-
! 
| Joshua Van Sant
|  | Democratic
| 1853
|  | Incumbent lost re-election.New member elected.Know Nothing gain.
| nowrap | 

|-
! 
| William Thomas Hamilton
|  | Democratic
| 1849
|  | Incumbent lost re-election.New member elected.Know Nothing gain.
| nowrap | 

|-
! 
| Henry May
|  | Democratic
| 1853
|  | Incumbent lost re-election.New member elected.Know Nothing gain.
| nowrap | 

|-
! 
| Augustus Rhodes Sollers
|  | Whig
| 1853
|  | Incumbent retired.New member elected.Democratic gain.
| nowrap | 

|}

Massachusetts 

|-
! 
| Thomas D. Eliot
|  | Whig
| 1854 (special)
|  | Incumbent lost re-election.New member elected.Know Nothing gain.
| nowrap | 

|-
! 
| Samuel L. Crocker
|  | Whig
| 1852
|  | Incumbent lost re-election.New member elected.Know Nothing gain.
| nowrap | 

|-
! 
| J. Wiley Edmands
|  | Whig
| 1852
|  | Incumbent retired.New member elected.Know Nothing gain.
| nowrap | 

|-
! 
| Samuel H. Walley
|  | Whig
| 1852
|  | Incumbent lost re-election.New member elected.Know Nothing gain.
| nowrap | 

|-
! 
| William Appleton
|  | Whig
| 1850
|  | Incumbent lost re-election.New member elected.Know Nothing gain.
| nowrap | 

|-
! 
| Charles W. Upham
|  | Whig
| 1852
|  | Incumbent lost re-election.New member elected.Know Nothing gain.
| nowrap | 

|-
! 
| Nathaniel P. Banks
|  | Democratic
| 1852
|  | Incumbent re-elected to a new party.Know Nothing gain.
| nowrap | 

|-
! 
| Tappan Wentworth
|  | Whig
| 1852
|  | Incumbent lost re-election.New member elected.Know Nothing gain.
| nowrap | 

|-
! 
| Alexander DeWitt
|  | Free Soil
| 1852
|  | Incumbent re-elected to a new party.Know Nothing gain.
| nowrap | 

|-
! 
| Edward Dickinson
|  | Whig
| 1852
|  | Incumbent lost re-election.New member elected.Know Nothing gain.
| nowrap | 

|-
! 
| John Z. Goodrich
|  | Whig
| 1852
|  | Incumbent lost re-election.New member elected.Know Nothing gain.
| nowrap | 

|}

Michigan 

|-
! 
| David Stuart
|  | Democratic
| 1852
|  | Incumbent lost re-election.New member elected.Republican gain.
| nowrap | 

|-
! 
| David A. Noble
|  | Democratic
| 1852
|  | Incumbent lost re-election.New member elected.Republican gain.
| nowrap | 

|-
! 
| Samuel Clark
|  | Democratic
| 1852
|  | Incumbent lost re-election.New member elected.Republican gain.
| nowrap | 

|-
! 
| Hestor L. Stevens
|  | Democratic
| 1852
|  | Incumbent retired.New member elected.Democratic hold.
| nowrap | 

|}

Mississippi 

|-
! 
| Daniel B. Wright
| 
| 1853
| Incumbent re-elected.
| nowrap | 

|-
! 
| William S. Barry
| 
| 1853
|  | Incumbent retired to run for state representative.New member elected.Democratic hold.
| nowrap | 

|-
! 
| William Barksdale
| 
| 1853
| Incumbent re-elected.
| nowrap | 

|-
! 
| Otho R. Singleton
| 
| 1853
|  | Incumbent lost re-election.New member elected.Know Nothing gain.
| nowrap | 

|-
! 
| colspan=3 | None 
|  | New seat.New member elected.Democratic gain.
| nowrap | 

|}

Missouri 

|-
! 
| Thomas Hart Benton
|  | Democratic
| 1852
|  | Incumbent lost re-election.New member elected.Whig gain.
| nowrap | 

|-
! 
| Alfred W. Lamb
|  | Democratic
| 1852
|  | Incumbent retired.New member elected.Whig gain.
| nowrap | 

|-
! 
| James J. Lindley
|  | Whig
| 1852
| Incumbent re-elected.
| nowrap | 

|-
! 
| Mordecai Oliver
|  | Whig
| 1852
| Incumbent re-elected.
| nowrap | 

|-
! 
| John G. Miller
|  | Whig
| 1850
| Incumbent re-elected.
| nowrap | 

|-
! 
| John S. Phelps
|  | Democratic
| 1844
| Incumbent re-elected.
| nowrap | 

|-
! 
| Samuel Caruthers
|  | Whig
| 1852
| Incumbent re-elected.
| nowrap | 

|}

New Hampshire 

|-
! 
| George W. Kittredge
|  | Democratic
| 1853
|  | Incumbent lost re-election.New member elected.Know Nothing gain.
| nowrap | 

|-
! 
| George W. Morrison
|  | Democratic
| 1853
|  | Incumbent lost re-election.New member elected.Know Nothing gain.
| nowrap | 

|-
! 
| Harry Hibbard
|  | Democratic
| 1849
|  | Incumbent retired.New member elected.Know Nothing gain.
| nowrap | 

|}

New Jersey 

|-
! 
| Nathan T. Stratton
|  | Democratic
| 1850
|  | Incumbent retired.New member elected.Whig gain.
| nowrap | 

|-
! 
| Charles Skelton
|  | Democratic
| 1850
|  | Incumbent retired.New member elected.Whig gain.
| nowrap | 

|-
! 
| Samuel Lilly
|  | Democratic
| 1852
|  | Incumbent lost re-election.New member elected.Whig gain.
| nowrap | 

|-
! 
| George Vail
|  | Democratic
| 1852
| Incumbent re-elected.
| nowrap | 

|-
! 
| Alexander C. M. Pennington
|  | Whig
| 1852
| Incumbent re-elected.
| nowrap | 

|}

New York 

|-
! 

|-
! 

|-
! 

|-
! 

|-
! 

|-
! 

|-
! 

|-
! 

|-
! 

|-
! 

|-
! 

|-
! 

|-
! 

|-
! 

|-
! 

|-
! 

|-
! 

|-
! 

|-
! 

|-
! 

|-
! 

|-
! 

|-
! 

|-
! 

|-
! 

|-
! 

|-
! 

|-
! 

|-
! 

|-
! 

|-
! 

|-
! 

|-
! 

|}

North Carolina 

|-
! 
| Henry Marchmore Shaw
|  | Democratic
| 1853
|  | Incumbent lost re-election.New member elected.Know Nothing gain.
| nowrap | 

|-
! 
| Thomas Hart Ruffin
|  | Democratic
| 1853
| Incumbent re-elected.
| nowrap | 

|-
! 
| William Shepperd Ashe
|  | Democratic
| 1849
|  | Incumbent retired.New member elected.Democratic hold.
| nowrap | 

|-
! 
| Sion Hart Rogers
|  | Whig
| 1853
|  | Incumbent retired.New member elected.Democratic gain.
| nowrap | 

|-
! 
| John Kerr Jr.
|  | Whig
| 1853
|  | Incumbent lost re-election.New member elected.Know Nothing gain.
| nowrap | 

|-
! 
| Richard Clauselle Puryear
|  | Whig
| 1853
| Incumbent re-elected.
| nowrap | 

|-
! 
| Francis Burton Craige
|  | Democratic
| 1853
| Incumbent re-elected.
| nowrap | 

|-
! 
| Thomas Lanier Clingman
|  | Democratic
| 18431845 1847
| Incumbent re-elected.
| nowrap | 

|}

Ohio 

|-
! 
| David T. Disney
|  | Democratic
| 1848
|  | Incumbent retired.New member elected.Anti-Nebraska gain.
| nowrap | 

|-
! 
| John Scott Harrison
|  | Whig
| 1852
|  | Incumbent re-elected to a new party.Anti-Nebraska gain.
| nowrap | 

|-
! 
| Lewis D. Campbell
|  | Whig
| 1848
|  | Incumbent re-elected to a new party.Anti-Nebraska gain.
| nowrap | 

|-
! 
| Matthias H. Nichols
|  | Democratic
| 1852
|  | Incumbent re-elected to a new party.Anti-Nebraska gain.
| nowrap | 

|-
! 
| Alfred Edgerton
|  | Democratic
| 1850
|  | Incumbent retired.New member elected.Anti-Nebraska gain.
| nowrap | 

|-
! 
| Andrew Ellison
|  | Democratic
| 1852
|  | Incumbent lost re-election.New member elected.Anti-Nebraska gain.
| nowrap | 

|-
! 
| Aaron Harlan
|  | Whig
| 1852
|  | Incumbent re-elected to a new party.Anti-Nebraska gain.
| nowrap | 

|-
! 
| Moses Bledso Corwin
|  | Whig
| 1852
|  | Incumbent retired.New member elected.Anti-Nebraska gain.
| nowrap | 

|-
! 
| Frederick W. Green
|  | Democratic
| 1850
|  | Incumbent retired.New member elected.Anti-Nebraska gain.
| nowrap | 

|-
! 
| John L. Taylor
|  | Democratic
| 1846
|  | Incumbent retired.New member elected.Anti-Nebraska gain.
| nowrap | 

|-
! 
| Thomas Ritchey
|  | Democratic
| 1852
|  | Incumbent retired.New member elected.Anti-Nebraska gain.
| nowrap | 

|-
! 
| Edson B. Olds
|  | Democratic
| 1848
|  | Incumbent lost re-election.New member elected.Anti-Nebraska gain.
| nowrap | 

|-
! 
| William D. Lindsley
|  | Democratic
| 1852
|  | Incumbent lost re-election.New member elected.Anti-Nebraska gain.
| nowrap | 

|-
! 
| Harvey H. Johnson
|  | Democratic
| 1852
|  | Incumbent retired.New member elected.Anti-Nebraska gain.
| nowrap | 

|-
! 
| William R. Sapp
|  | Whig
| 1852
|  | Incumbent re-elected to a new party.Anti-Nebraska gain.
| nowrap | 

|-
! 
| Edward Ball
|  | Whig
| 1852
|  | Incumbent re-elected to a new party.Anti-Nebraska gain.
| nowrap | 

|-
! 
| Wilson Shannon
|  | Democratic
| 1852
|  | Incumbent retired.New member elected.Anti-Nebraska gain.
| nowrap | 

|-
! 
| George Bliss
|  | Democratic
| 1852
|  | Incumbent retired.New member elected.Anti-Nebraska gain.
| nowrap | 

|-
! 
| Edward Wade
|  | Free Soil
| 1852
|  | Incumbent re-elected to a new party.Anti-Nebraska gain.
| nowrap | 

|-
! 
| Joshua Reed Giddings
|  | Free Soil
| 1843
|  | Incumbent re-elected to a new party.Anti-Nebraska gain.
| nowrap | 

|-
! 
| Andrew Stuart
|  | Democratic
| 1848
|  | Incumbent lost re-election.New member elected.Anti-Nebraska gain.
| nowrap | 

|}

Pennsylvania

|-
! 
| Thomas B. Florence
|  | Democratic
| 1848
| Incumbent re-elected.
| nowrap | 

|-
! 
| Joseph R. Chandler
|  | Whig
| 1848
|  | Incumbent lost re-election.New member elected.Whig hold.
| nowrap | 

|-
! 
| John Robbins
|  | Democratic
| 1848
|  | Incumbent retired.New member elected.Whig gain.
| nowrap | 

|-
! 
| William Henry Witte
|  | Democratic
| 1852
|  | Incumbent retired.New member elected.Know Nothing gain.
| nowrap | 

|-
! 
| John McNair
|  | Democratic
| 1850
|  | Incumbent retired.New member elected.Democratic hold.
| nowrap | 

|-
! 
| William Everhart
|  | Whig
| 1852
|  | Incumbent retired.New member elected.Democratic gain.
| nowrap | 

|-
! 
| Samuel A. Bridges
|  | Democratic
| 1852
|  | Incumbent lost re-election.New member elected.Republican gain.
| nowrap | 

|-
! 
| J. Glancy Jones
|  | Democratic
| 1854
| Incumbent re-elected.
| nowrap | 

|-
! 
| Isaac E. Hiester
|  | Whig
| 1852
|  | Incumbent lost re-election.New member elected.Independent gain.
| nowrap | 

|-
! 
| Ner Middleswarth
|  | Whig
| 1852
|  | Incumbent retired.New member elected.Whig hold.
| nowrap | 

|-
! 
| Christian M. Straub
|  | Democratic
| 1852
|  | Incumbent retired.New member elected.Whig gain.
| nowrap | 

|-
! 
| Hendrick B. Wright
|  | Democratic
| 1852
|  | Incumbent lost re-election.New member elected.Whig gain.
| nowrap | 

|-
! 
| Asa Packer
|  | Democratic
| 1852
| Incumbent re-elected.
| nowrap | 

|-
! 
| Galusha A. Grow
|  | Democratic
| 1850
| Incumbent re-elected.
| nowrap | 

|}

Rhode Island 

|-
! 
| Thomas Davis
|  | Democratic
| 1853
|  | Incumbent lost re-election.New member elected.Know Nothing gain.
| nowrap | 

|-
! 
| Benjamin Babock Thurston
|  | Democratic
| 1851
|  | Incumbent re-elected to a new party.Know Nothing gain.
| nowrap | 

|}

South Carolina 

|-
! 
| John McQueen
|  | Democratic
| 1849 
| Incumbent re-elected.
| nowrap | 

|-
! 
| William Aiken Jr.
|  | Democratic
| 1850
| Incumbent re-elected.
| nowrap | 

|-
! 
| Laurence M. Keitt
|  | Democratic
| 1853
| Incumbent re-elected.
| nowrap | 

|-
! 
| Preston S. Brooks
|  | Democratic
| 1853
| Incumbent re-elected.
| nowrap | 

|-
! 
| James L. Orr
|  | Democratic
| 1853
| Incumbent re-elected.
| nowrap | 

|-
! 
| William W. Boyce
|  | Democratic
| 1853
| Incumbent re-elected.
| nowrap | 

|}

Tennessee 

Elections held late, on August 2, 1855.

|-
! 
| Nathaniel G. Taylor
|  | Whig
| 1854 (special)
|  |Incumbent lost re-election as a Know Nothing.New member elected.Democratic gain.
| nowrap | 

|-
! | 
| William M. Churchwell
|  | Democratic
| 1851
|  |Incumbent retired.New member elected.Know Nothing gain.
| nowrap | 

|-
! 
| Samuel A. Smith
|  | Democratic
| 1853
| Incumbent re-elected.
| nowrap | 

|-
! 
| William Cullom
|  | Whig
| 1851
|  |Incumbent lost re-election.New member elected.Democratic gain.
|  nowrap | 

|-
! 
| Charles Ready
|  | Whig 
| 1853
|  |Incumbent re-elected to a new party.Know Nothing gain.
| nowrap | 

|-
! 
| George W. Jones
|  | Democratic
| 1842
| Incumbent re-elected.
|  

|-
! 
| Robert M. Bugg
|  | Whig
| 1853
|  |Incumbent retired.New member elected.Democratic gain.
| nowrap | 

|-
! 
| Felix Zollicoffer
|  | Whig
| 1853
|  |Incumbent re-elected to a new party.Know Nothing gain.
| nowrap | 

|-
! 
| Emerson Etheridge
|  | Whig
| 1853
|  |Incumbent re-elected to a new party.Know Nothing gain.
| nowrap | 

|-
! 
| Frederick P. Stanton
|  | Democratic
| 1845
|  |Incumbent retired.New member elected.Know Nothing gain.
| nowrap | 

|}

Texas 

|-
! 
| George W. Smyth
|  | Democratic
| 1853
|  | Incumbent retired.New member elected.Know Nothing gain.
| nowrap | 

|-
! 
| Peter Hansborough Bell
|  | Democratic
| 1853
| Incumbent re-elected.
| nowrap | 

|}

Vermont 

|-
! 
| James Meacham
|  | Whig
| 1849 
| Incumbent re-elected.
| nowrap | 

|-
! 
| Andrew Tracy
|  | Whig
| 1852
|  | Incumbent retired.New member elected.Republican gain.
| nowrap | 

|-
! 
| Alvah Sabin
|  | Whig
| 1852
| Incumbent re-elected.
| nowrap | 

|}

Virginia 

|-
! 
| Thomas H. Bayly
|  | Democratic
| 1853
| Incumbent re-elected.
| nowrap | 
|-
! 
| John Millson
|  | Democratic
| 1853
| Incumbent re-elected.
| nowrap | 
|-
! 
| John S. Caskie
|  | Democratic
| 1853
| Incumbent re-elected.
| nowrap | 
|-
! 
| William Goode
|  | Democratic
| 1853
| Incumbent re-elected.
| nowrap | 
|-
! 
| Thomas S. Bocock
|  | Democratic
| 1853
| Incumbent re-elected.
| nowrap | 
|-
! 
| Paulus Powell
|  | Democratic
| 1853
| Incumbent re-elected.
| nowrap | 
|-
! 
| William Smith
|  | Democratic
| 1853
| Incumbent re-elected.
| nowrap | 
|-
! 
| Charles J. Faulkner
|  | Democratic
| 1853
| Incumbent re-elected.
| nowrap | 
|-
! 
| John Letcher
|  | Democratic
| 1851
| Incumbent re-elected.
| nowrap | 
|-
! 
| Zedekiah Kidwell
|  | Democratic
| 1853
| Incumbent re-elected.
| nowrap | 
|-
! 
| Charles S. Lewis
|  | Democratic
| 1853
|  | Incumbent lost re-election.New member elected.Know Nothing gain.
| nowrap | 
|-
! 
| Henry A. Edmundson
|  | Democratic
| 1849
| Incumbent re-elected.
| nowrap | 
|-
! 
| Fayette McMullen
|  | Democratic
| 1849
| Incumbent re-elected.
| nowrap | 
|}

Wisconsin

Election results in Wisconsin for 1854:

|-
! 
| Daniel Wells Jr.
|  | Democratic
| 1852
| Incumbent re-elected.
| nowrap | 

|-
! 
| Ben C. Eastman
|  | Democratic
| 1850
|  | Incumbent retired.New member elected.Republican gain.
| nowrap | 

|-
! 
| John B. Macy
|  | Democratic
| 1852
|  | Incumbent lost re-election.New member elected.Republican gain.
| nowrap | 

|}

Non-voting delegates 

|-
! 
| colspan=3 | New seat
|  | New territory.New delegate elected December 20, 1854.Democratic gain.
| nowrap | 

|-
! 
| Henry Mower Rice
|  | Democratic
| 1852
| Incumbent re-elected.
| nowrap | 

|-
! (33rd Congress)
| colspan=3 | New seat
|  | New territory.New delegate elected December 12, 1854.Democratic gain.
| nowrap | 

|-
! (34th Congress)
| Napoleon Bonaparte Giddings
|  | Democratic
| 1854
|  | Incumbent retired.New delegate elected November 5, 1855.Democratic hold.
| nowrap | 

|-
! 
| Joseph Lane
|  | Democratic
| 1851
| Incumbent re-elected.
| nowrap | 

|}

See also
 1854 United States elections
 List of United States House of Representatives elections (1824–1854)
 1854–55 United States Senate elections
 33rd United States Congress
 34th United States Congress

Notes

References

Bibliography

External links
 Office of the Historian (Office of Art & Archives, Office of the Clerk, U.S. House of Representatives)